Miao Miao (born 14 January 1981, Tianjin, China) is an Australian table tennis player who represented Australia at the Sydney, Athens, Beijing and London Olympic Games. Her best Olympic result was the quarter finals of the doubles tournament in Sydney. At the 2006 Commonwealth Games in Melbourne, she won a silver medal in the teams competition and a bronze medal in the doubles with Jian Fang Lay. Her parents immigrated to Poland when she was a child, and later to Australia. She is the highest ranked Australian table tennis player at the time of the 2008 Beijing Olympics. Virtually unknown in Australia she is well known in China.

Miao Miao is a right-handed, fast attack shakehand player. She is coached by her father Miao Cang Sheng (苗仓生) who was a well known coach in China but then became the coach of the Polish women table tennis team in 1994. Miao Miao became the Polish women doubles champion in 1996. Miao Miao migrated to Australia with her father in 1997. She was a 15-year adolescent when she first arrived in Australia but then quickly established her as one of top table tennis players in Australia. Miao became Australian junior champion in singles, doubles and mixed doubles and Australian senior singles champion as well as winning a series of other events both in Australia and abroad. She also has the rare distinction of representing Australia at four successive Olympic games in 2000, 2004, 2008 and 2012.

Her father was a table tennis player and coach, and her mother represented China in sprinting. Miao speaks three languages, Chinese, English and Polish, and she enjoys playing table tennis. She is one of the most successful Australian table tennis players.

References

External links
 Australian Olympic Committee profile
 Miao Miao's Facebook account

1981 births
Living people
Sportswomen from Victoria (Australia)
Olympic table tennis players of Australia
Table tennis players at the 2000 Summer Olympics
Table tennis players at the 2004 Summer Olympics
Table tennis players at the 2008 Summer Olympics
Australian people of Chinese descent
Australian female table tennis players
Table tennis players at the 2012 Summer Olympics
Table tennis players at the 2014 Commonwealth Games
Sportspeople from Melbourne
Commonwealth Games medallists in table tennis
Commonwealth Games silver medallists for Australia
Commonwealth Games bronze medallists for Australia
Table tennis players from Tianjin
Naturalised table tennis players
Table tennis players at the 2018 Commonwealth Games
Chinese emigrants to Australia
Medallists at the 2002 Commonwealth Games
Medallists at the 2006 Commonwealth Games